Oakville—Milton was a federal electoral district represented in the House of Commons of Canada from 1988 to 1997. It was located in the province of Ontario. This riding was created in 1987 from Halton riding.

Oakville—Milton consisted of the Town of Oakville, and the part of the Town of Milton lying northeast of Tremaine Road and southeast of the Macdonald-Cartier Freeway.

The electoral district was abolished in 1996 when it was re-distributed between Halton and Oakville ridings.

Members of Parliament

This riding has elected the following Members of Parliament:

Election results

|-
  
|Liberal
| Bonnie Brown
|align="right"| 34,273
  
|Progressive Conservative
|Ann Mulvale
|align="right"|  19,153

 
|New Democratic Party
| Willie Lambert
|align="right"| 1,756 
  
|Natural Law
|Harry Bright
|align="right"| 543
 
|Independent
|Ken Campbell
|align="right"|  432 
|}

See also 

 List of Canadian federal electoral districts
 Past Canadian electoral districts

External links 

 Website of the Parliament of Canada

Former federal electoral districts of Ontario